Mendel Shapiro is a Jerusalem lawyer and Modern Orthodox Rabbi. He is the author of a halakhic analysis arguing that women could be called to read from the Torah in prayer services with men on Shabbat under certain conditions. His minority viewpoint, which contravened both tradition, and according to many poskim Halacha itself, became the subject of extensive dispute within the Modern Orthodox Jewish world. Gidon Rothstein wrote in the Rabbinical Council of America's flagship journal Tradition that

Both for its inherent interest as an attempt to mine sources creatively and for its impact on the current Orthodox world, R. Shapiro's analysis deserves serious consideration.

However, Rothstein went on to critique all of Shapiro's core arguments, saying they have "conspicuously weak textual support," and concluded that Shapiro's analysis "has not meaningfully succeeded".

Shapiro holds B.A. and M.S. degrees from Yeshiva University and a J.D. from Columbia Law School. He received Semicha (Rabbinic Ordination) from the Rabbi Isaac Elchanan Theological Seminary of Yeshiva University.

See also
 Shira Hadasha
 Partnership minyan

References

 Mendel Shapiro,  “Qeri’at ha-Torah by Women: A Halakhic Analysis” (Edah 1:2, 2001) (pdf)
 Gidon Rothstein, "Women’s Aliyyot in Contemporary Synagogues." Tradition 39:2, Summer 2005. (Critical analysis published in the Orthodox Rabbinical Council of America's official journal)
 Eliav Shochetman. Sinay 135-136 (2005), pp. 271–336  (Article by Hebrew University Law School professor criticizing Mendel Shapiro's analysis )
http://www.edah.org/backend/JournalArticle/1_2_henkin.pdf
http://www.thejewishweek.com/news/newscontent.php3?artid=6937&print=yes
http://www.cjnews.com/pastissues/02/nov21-02/international/int2.htm
http://www.jta.org/page_print_story.asp?intarticleid=12072&intcategoryid=5
https://web.archive.org/web/20070704154035/http://www.kehilathadar.org/Aboutus/jewishweek08-02-02.html

Judaism and women
American Modern Orthodox rabbis
Jewish feminists
Living people
Rabbi Isaac Elchanan Theological Seminary semikhah recipients
Columbia Law School alumni
Year of birth missing (living people)
Rabbis in Jerusalem
21st-century American Jews
Lawyers from Jerusalem